Joseph DeZart II (born June 9, 1998) is a professional soccer player who currently plays as a midfielder. Born in the United States, he represented the Jamaica national under-20 team.

Early life
Born in Jackson Township, New Jersey, DeZart started his prep career at Jackson Memorial High School, playing his freshman year with the school's men's soccer team before transferring to YSC Academy in Wayne, Pennsylvania, for his junior and senior seasons. A member of the Philadelphia Union Academy, he played with the Union U16s and made it to the USSDA finals. He also competed in the Generation Adidas Cup.

Wake Forest Demon Deacons
DeZart played four years of college soccer at Wake Forest University between 2016 and 2019, making 65 appearances for their men's soccer team. After only featuring in three games as a freshman, DeZart played over 1,000 minutes in each of the following three seasons including when the team earned its first No. 1 national ranking in program history in 2017 and reached the 2019 College Cup semifinal. DeZart ended his college career with two goals, four assists, three ACC regular season titles and two ACC tournament wins.

While at college, DeZart also played for USL League Two sides Reading United and North Carolina Fusion U23.

Club career

Orlando City
DeZart was selected in the second round (31st overall) of the 2020 MLS SuperDraft by Orlando City. On February 21, 2020, DeZart signed a contract with Orlando following preseason. On July 25, 2020, he made his professional debut as an 83rd minute substitute in a 1–0 victory  over Montreal Impact during the MLS is Back Tournament round of 16. The club declined DeZart's contract option as part of the end of season roster moves on November 14, 2022.

International
In 2016, DeZart was called into the Jamaica U20 training camp and appeared for the team during 2017 CONCACAF U20 Championship qualifying in June 2016 as the team failed to advance from the first round.

Career statistics

College

Club

Honors

College
Wake Forest Demon Deacons
Atlantic Coast Conference regular season: 2016, 2017, 2018
ACC Men's Soccer Tournament: 2016, 2017
NCAA College Cup runner-up: 2016

Club
Orlando City
U.S. Open Cup: 2022

References

External links

Wake Forest profile

1998 births
Living people
People from Jackson Township, New Jersey
Soccer players from New Jersey
Jamaican footballers
Jamaica youth international footballers
American soccer players
American sportspeople of Jamaican descent
Association football midfielders
Orlando City SC draft picks
Orlando City SC players
Reading United A.C. players
Sportspeople from Ocean County, New Jersey
Wake Forest Demon Deacons men's soccer players
Jackson Memorial High School alumni
USL League Two players
Major League Soccer players
Orlando City B players
USL League One players
MLS Next Pro players